Standing on the Line is a Canadian documentary film, directed by Paul-Émile d'Entremont and released in 2019. Addressing issues of homophobia in the world of sports, figures appearing in the film include speed skater Anastasia Bucsis, soccer player David Testo, and hockey player Brock McGillis.

The film premiered on May 12, 2019 at the DOXA Documentary Film Festival.

References

External links

2019 films
2019 documentary films
2019 LGBT-related films
Canadian sports documentary films
Canadian LGBT-related films
Documentary films about LGBT sportspeople
National Film Board of Canada documentaries
2010s English-language films
2010s Canadian films
English-language Canadian films